The Swedish Polar Research Secretariat (Swedish: Polarforskningssekretariatet) is a government agency in charge of coordinating and promoting Swedish polar research activities. It is located in Stockholm, has more than 30 employees, and serves under the Ministry of Education and Research.

Research platforms and activities

The Swedish Polar Research Secretariat does not conduct research itself, but it provides support to researchers - typically at universities - by organizing expeditions to polar regions, operating research stations, and providing an overall research infrastructure (logistics etc.). It also promotes polar research that does not require field work, and it takes an active role in the dissemination of research results. As part of this effort, teachers and artists are routinely part of Swedish research expeditions.

In 1987-1988, the Secretariat set up its first research station in Antarctica, Svea. The next year, the Wasa Research Station was opened. As of 2010, the Secretariat is also in charge of the Abisko Scientific Research Station in sub-arctic Sweden. In (northern) summer, it charters the icebreaker Oden from the Swedish Maritime Administration for research expeditions to the Arctic Ocean.

The Swedish Polar Research Secretariat represents Sweden (or supports the government) in international negotiations and cooperations pertaining to polar issues. It actively pursues environmental protection of the polar regions. It is furthermore the agency that issues permits to Swedish citizens to conduct research in Antarctica, pursuant to the Swedish Antarctic Act (2006:924).

History
As Swedish polar research advanced in the early 1980s, there was a growing need for more funding, coordination and logistic support. The Swedish Polar Research Secretariat started in 1984 with a budget of 4 million SEK. That same year, Sweden became an associated member of the Antarctic Treaty System, followed by full membership in 1988. In order to achieve full membership, Sweden had to operate a research station in Antarctica, and the 12 m2 Svea station was rapidly set up in 1987-1988. The next year, the bigger Swea station opened. A few years later, the Oden became yet another research platform, and in 1991, Oden and the German Polarstern became the first conventional vessels to reach the North Pole.

Directors-General
 Anders Karlqvist (1984–1993, 1995–2009)
 Olle Melander (1993–1995)
 Björn Dahlbäck (2010-2017)
 Katarina Gårdfeldt (2018-)

External links 
 Official website of the Swedish Polar Research Secretariat 
 Official Twitter-feed 
 Official YouTube channel of the Swedish Polar Research Secretariat

References

''This article is based on information from the Swedish Wikipedia-article about the same subject, and on information obtained from the official site of the Swedish Polar Research Secretariat (both in March 2015).

Government agencies of Sweden
Sweden and the Antarctic
Arctic research
Science and technology in Sweden
Antarctic research